Tipp FM (Tipperary Local Radio), licensed since 1989 by the Broadcasting Commission of Ireland, is the local radio station covering County Tipperary.  In addition to the official franchise area, the station also enjoys a listenership in neighbouring counties.

History
The station was licensed in 1989, initially to the north/south-east of County Tipperary. When the licence was renewed in 2003, the franchise was expanded to the whole of the county. Tipp FM is a full service licensed station whose franchise covers the whole of Co Tipperary. In recent years, Tipp FM has received back to back Digital Media Awards from the Camogie Association of Ireland as well as receiving awards for its road safety campaigns. Tipp Today, the station's flagship show broadcast from 9am to 12 noon weekdays, continues to be the highest ranking show across the premier county. The station employs over fifty people including full and part-time.

Studios
The station has studios in Clonmel and Nenagh together with a mobile broadcast unit.

Frequencies

External links
TippFM

References

Radio stations in the Republic of Ireland
Mass media in County Tipperary